Marcelo Cañete (born 16 April 1990) is an Argentine-Paraguayan footballer who plays as an attacking midfielder for Universidad de Chile in the Primera División.

Career
Cañete started his professional career with Boca Juniors, debuting with the first team in 2010. In 2011, he was loaned to Chilean Universidad Católica. After a good performance at Universidad Católica he was signed by São Paulo for three million US$ ($3,000,000). In 2013, he was loaned to Portuguesa. In 2014, he was back on São Paulo's roster but did not perform well. He suffered minor injuries, was taken off the squad and placed in the reserves. He later trained with the Sub-20 squad, in the training center in Cotia. He was loaned to Náutico August 2014.

Personal life
His mother is from Paraguay. Cañete is the cousin of the footballer Ezequiel Cañete.

References

External links
 
 
 

1990 births
Living people
Footballers from Buenos Aires
Argentine sportspeople of Paraguayan descent
Argentine footballers
Association football midfielders
Argentine Primera División players
Campeonato Brasileiro Série A players
Campeonato Brasileiro Série B players
Argentine expatriate footballers
Expatriate footballers in Chile
Expatriate footballers in Paraguay
Argentine expatriate sportspeople in Brazil
Expatriate footballers in Brazil
Boca Juniors footballers
Club Deportivo Universidad Católica footballers
São Paulo FC players
Associação Portuguesa de Desportos players
Clube Náutico Capibaribe players
São Bernardo Futebol Clube players
Clube de Regatas Brasil players
Club Libertad footballers
Club Guaraní players
Sportivo Luqueño players
Deportivo Capiatá players
Cobresal footballers
Universidad de Chile footballers
C.D. Huachipato footballers